Henry Carl Luckey (November 22, 1868 – December 31, 1956) was an American Democratic Party politician.

He was born on November 22, 1868, near East St. Louis, Illinois. In 1873 he moved to Nebraska settling on a farm with his parents near Columbus, Nebraska. He farmed there from 1894 to 1900. He moved to Lincoln, Nebraska and graduated from the University of Nebraska-Lincoln in 1912. He also passed the bar in 1912 and then pursued a postgraduate course at Columbia University in New York City in 1914 and 1915.

He was in the real estate and the construction business from 1917 to 1927, and a member of the board of trustees of Midland Lutheran College in Fremont, Nebraska from 1919 to 1925. He was elected to the Seventy-fourth United States Congress and reelected to the Seventy-fifth United States Congress. He ran twice more in 1938 for the Seventy-sixth United States Congress and in 1940 for the Seventy-seventh United States Congress, but failed to be reelected. He returned then to the real estate business and farming until 1946 when he retired to Richmond, California. He died on December 31, 1956, in El Cerrito, California and is buried there in Sunset View Cemetery.

References
 
 
 
 

1868 births
1956 deaths
University of Nebraska–Lincoln alumni
People from East St. Louis, Illinois
Politicians from Richmond, California
People from Columbus, Nebraska
Businesspeople from Nebraska
Nebraska lawyers
Columbia University alumni
Democratic Party members of the United States House of Representatives from Nebraska